Beacon Fell may refer to:

 Beacon Fell, Cumbria, England
 Beacon Fell, Lancashire, England, a Country Park since 1970
 Beacon Fell Traditional Lancashire Cheese named after the fell

See also
 Beacon Hill (disambiguation)